Jan Hadrava (born 3 June 1991) is a Czech professional volleyball player. He is a member of the Czech Republic national team. At the professional club level, he plays for Jastrzębski Węgiel.

Honours
 National championships
 2012/2013  Czech Cup, with Dukla Liberec
 2013/2014  Czech Cup, with Dukla Liberec
 2020/2021  Italian Cup, with Cucine Lube Civitanova
 2020/2021  Italian Championship, with Cucine Lube Civitanova
 2021/2022  Polish SuperCup, with Jastrzębski Węgiel
 2021/2022  Polish Championship, with Jastrzębski Węgiel
 2022/2023  Polish SuperCup, with Jastrzębski Węgiel

Individual awards
 2018: Polish Championship – Best Scorer
 2018: Polish Championship – Best Spiker
 2022: Best Czech Volleyball Player

References

External links
 
 Player profile at LegaVolley.it 
 Player profile at PlusLiga.pl 
 Player profile at Volleybox.net

1991 births
Living people
People from Rokycany
Sportspeople from the Plzeň Region
Czech men's volleyball players
European Games competitors for the Czech Republic
Beach volleyball players at the 2015 European Games
Czech expatriate sportspeople in France
Expatriate volleyball players in France
Czech expatriate sportspeople in Poland
Expatriate volleyball players in Poland
Czech expatriate sportspeople in Italy
Expatriate volleyball players in Italy
AZS Olsztyn players
Jastrzębski Węgiel players
Opposite hitters